Trump International Hotel Waikiki or Trump Waikiki is a condo-hotel in Honolulu, Hawaii. The building includes The Spa at Trump and dining space, as well as a fitness center, library, lobby bar, cafe, parking and 6th floor ocean view residential and hotel lobby.

History
In 2005, Outrigger Hotels & Resorts was negotiating with several developers about a project for the site. Irongate, a Los Angeles-based real estate development and investment company, purchased the development rights for the property later that year. Donald Trump's company, The Trump Organization, later partnered with Irongate to develop a project on the site. On May 31, 2006, Trump announced plans for Trump International Hotel and Tower Waikiki Beach Walk, to be built on the property. Construction was to begin in early 2007, with completion planned for early 2009.

In July 2006, demolition of the Royal Islander and Reef Lanai hotels made room for Trump Waikiki. On November 10, 2006, almost three full years before completion, all 462 units were pre-sold in one day for a total of $700 million, or $1.5 million on average. The building opened on November 1, 2009, and by February 2010, 361 of the hotel-condominium's 462 units were still vacant due to "an internal matter with the financing of the building."

Relationship with Donald Trump
Although a part of the global Trump Hotels, the property is not owned, developed, nor does it contain property sold by Donald Trump, The Trump Organization, or any of their affiliates. The hotel's owner Irongate licenses the Trump name from Trump Marks Waikiki LLC.

See also

References

External links 
Official Trump International Hotel Waikiki website
Official Trump Waikiki Residences website 

Hotels in Honolulu
Waikiki
Buildings and structures in Honolulu
Condo hotels in the United States
Residential condominiums in the United States
Skyscrapers in Honolulu
Hotel buildings completed in 2009
Residential buildings completed in 2009
Skyscraper hotels in Hawaii
2009 establishments in Hawaii